Ephysteris flavida is a moth in the family Gelechiidae. It was described by Povolný in 1969. It is found in Mongolia, Iran and China (Inner Mongolia, Xinjiang)

The length of the forewings is 3.9–5 mm. The forewings are covered with cream, yellow-tipped scales and mottled by dark-grey scales along the costal margin and termen. The hindwings are pale grey. Adults are on wing in August in China.

References

Ephysteris
Moths described in 1969